Toensbergia blastidiata is a species of crustose lichen in the family Sporastatiaceae. Found in northwestern North America, it was described as a new species in 2020 by lichenologists Toby Spribille and Tor Tønsberg. The type specimen was collected in Glacier Bay National Park at the base of Marble Mountain (Alaska). Here the lichen was found growing on the bark of Alnus viridis subsp. crispa. The specific epithet blastidiata refers to the "blastidiate thallus surface"; blastidia are vegetative propagules  containing both mycobiont and photobiont, which are produced by yeast-like "budding".

Toensbergia blastidiata is widespread in northwestern North America with a range extending from Kodiak Island south to the Olympic Mountains of Washington State. It is a corticolous lichen that has been recorded from the bark of Alnus viridis subsp. crispa, A. incana subsp. tenuifolia, A. rubra, Frangula purshiana, Malus fusca, and Pinus contorta.

References

Lecanoromycetes
Lichen species
Lichens described in 2020
Lichens of Western Canada
Lichens of Subarctic America
Taxa named by Toby Spribille
Fungi without expected TNC conservation status
Lichens of the Northwestern United States